Initium Media is a Singapore-based digital media outlet launched in August 2015.  It mainly provides in-depths news, opinions and lifestyle content to Chinese-speaking readers worldwide with the aim of staking out neutral terrain among Chinese readers in Hong Kong, Taiwan, mainland China, and abroad.

Initium Media has explained that its naming concept was sourced from a passage from the writings of Mencius in which the word "端" ("beginning", or "initium" in Latin) is significant:  “The sense of concern for others is the starting point of Humaneness. The feeling of shame and disgust is the starting point of Fairness. The sense of humility and deference is the starting point of Propriety and the sense of right and wrong is the starting point of Wisdom.” 

By 2019, it had 33,000 paid members of the company's online subscription for the in-depth articles which was started in July 2017.  It has users from more than 200 different countries and territories, the vast majority being in Hong Kong and Taiwan, with the rest coming from the U.S., Japan and elsewhere.

Initium Media currently has 10 channels, which are Daily News, Opinions, International News, Hong Kong News, China News, Taiwan News, Culture, City, Parenting and Photos.

In August 2021, against the backdrop of increasing pressure on Hong Kong media outlets following the enactment of the national security law, Initium Media announced that they will move their headquarters from Hong Kong to Singapore.

Ownership and editorial team 
Initium Media's major shareholder is Will Cai, a Stanford-trained lawyer operating the company as a sideline to his duties at Skadden Arps, an investment he considered "better than buying a sports car."  Mr. Cai stepped down from his position at Initium Media when the media platform implemented its restructuring plan in April 2017.

Initium Media has a global editorial and development team of nearly 40 people in Hong Kong and Taiwan who are producing daily news reports, analysis, infographics, investigative stories and video pieces from around the world.

Its Chief Executive Editor was Zhang Jieping, who previously worked for Yazhou Zhoukan, a Chinese political magazine, iSun Affairs Magazine, a current affairs publication, and City Magazine, a lifestyle magazine.

April 2018, Taiwanese senior media professional Lee Chih-Te took over the Chief Executive Editor of The Initium, and left in 2020.

Jing Wu became the Chief Executive Editor in 2020, and left in 2022

Coverage 
Since its launch, Initium Media has been criticized both for being too antagonistic of the Chinese Communist Party and too supportive. Apple Daily, a Hong Kong newspaper owned by Jimmy Lai and critical of China's Communist Party rulers, accused Cai of having secret ties to mainland backers and Communist Party general secretary Xi Jinping. Some media observers say that The Initium has demonstrated its independence with in-depth reports such as these.

2020 raid 

On 10 August 2020, the Hong Kong offices of Apple Daily were searched by over 200 national security officers in a large-scale police raid, following Lai's arrest for alleged violations of the recently implemented national security law.

Journalists interviewed 7 reporters from AppleDaily that night and concluded up an article for restoring the experiences and thoughts of the reporters that day when they saw the company was searched by great number of polices and alleging violations of the national security law.

Tianjin explosion 

On August 12, 2015, a series of major explosions swept across the Binhai New Area, a busy port just 40 kilometres east of the northern Chinese city of Tianjin. The explosions occurred less than one kilometre from several high-density residential areas, and damage extended as far as two kilometres from the blast site.

Initium Media was one of the very few Hong Kong media that dispatched journalists to the scene, where toxic chemicals stored in a warehouse had erupted in a fireball that spewed debris and poisons over nearby apartments. The reporters slipped past security cordons to write about the disaster that claimed more than 150 lives and then reported on the connections of the warehouse owner. Initium Media also released an investigative report to trace the individuals behind this tragedy.

Application development 

Initium Media has an in-house data journalist team. One of its works is the Legco matrix project, through which they analyze over 200,000 voting records of Hong Kong legislative council and visualize the recent movement and voting trends of lawmakers.

It also dedicated a project in anticipation of the 2016 LegCo election.

Awards and recognition 
Initium Medium won numerous recognition in the SOPA Awards 2020.

Funding 
On December 2, 2015, Initium Media received a preferred share financing led by WI Harper Group, a leading global venture capital firm.

On April 6, 2017, the company announced it would be restructuring due to cash flow difficulties and staff would be laid off.

In July 2017, Initium Media kicked off a subscription model to charge readers for in-depth contents. The subscription divided into two memberships which are the normal membership and the premium one.

References

Mass media in Hong Kong
Mass media in Singapore
2015 establishments in Hong Kong
Hong Kong news websites
Singaporean news websites